Syrian Church may refer to:

- any Christian denomination belonging to the Christianity in Syria, including:
 Syrian Orthodox Churches - Orthodox denominations in Syria
 Syrian Catholic Churches - Catholic denominations in Syria
 Syrian Protestant Churches - Protestant denominations in Syria

See also
 Syrian (disambiguation)
 Syrian Orthodox Church (disambiguation)
 Syrian Catholic Church (disambiguation)
 Syriac Church (disambiguation)